Cyphotrypa is an extinct genus of Ordovician bryozoan. Its colonies form hemispherical shapes, with flat undersides and rounded tops. In cross-section, the zooecia (tubes housing individual zooids) fan out from the initial growth area and intersect the rounded top surface of the colony at right angles. A few scattered maculae are present, composed of a few zooecia larger than the others with mesopore-like apertures.

Species
The following species are recognized:

References

Trepostomata
Prehistoric bryozoan genera